Marek Kalivoda (born 2 August 1974) is a Czech former football player who has also worked as a football manager. He is currently the manager of FK Fotbal Třinec in the Czech National Football League.

Having previously served as the team's coach for the youth team, Kalivoda was appointed as the manager of Zlín, replacing Ladislav Minář in the summer of 2010. Having spent seven years with Zlín, Kalivoda left the club upon the expiry of his contract in 2011. He took over at Karviná in March 2012. In October 2012 he returned to Zlin.

References

External links
 Profile at iDNES.cz 

1974 births
Living people
Czech footballers
Czech football managers
FC Fastav Zlín managers
MFK Karviná managers
FK Fotbal Třinec managers

Association football goalkeepers
Czech National Football League managers